The 1974–75 season was Galatasaray's 71st in existence and the club's 17th consecutive season in the Turkish First Football League. This article shows statistics of the club's players in the season, and also lists all matches that the club have played in the season.

Squad statistics

Players in / out

In

Out

1. Lig

Standings

Matches

Turkiye Kupasi

Round of 32

Round of 16

1/4 Final

Başbakanlık Kupası

Friendly match

Donanma Vakfı Kupası

TSYD Kupası

Ali Sami Yen - Şeref Bey Kupası

Zafer Kupası

Hasan Tahsin Kupası

Quad-tournament

Barış Kupası

Friendly match

Attendance

References

 Tuncay, Bülent (2002). Galatasaray Tarihi. Yapı Kredi Yayınları 
 1979–1980 İstanbul Futbol Ligi. Türk Futbol Tarihi vol.1. page(121). (June 1992) Türkiye Futbol Federasyonu Yayınları.

External links
 Galatasaray Sports Club Official Website 
 Turkish Football Federation – Galatasaray A.Ş. 
 uefa.com – Galatasaray AŞ

Galatasaray S.K. (football) seasons
Turkish football clubs 1974–75 season
1970s in Istanbul
Galatasaray Sports Club 1974–75 season